The Rameswaram (Boat Mail) Express, previously known as Boat Mail or Indo-Ceylon Express, is an express train that connects Rameswaram with the state capital Chennai via Tambaram, Chengalpet,Melmaruvattur, Viluppuram, Cuddalore port, Chidambaram,Sirkazhi,Mayiladuthurai, Tanjore,  Trichy, Pudukkottai,Karaikudi, Sivagangai, Manamadurai,Ramanathapuram . During 1900's it was a combined train and steamer ferry service between India and Ceylon (now Sri Lanka). Connecting Chennai and Colombo, the system initially utilised a rail-to-sea operation, but changed to a rail-to-sea-to-rail operation. Passengers could buy a single ticket for the journey. Now at present, it runs from Chennai Egmore to Rameswaram via Villuppuram, Kumbakonam, Trichy, Pudukkottai, Karaikkudi, Devakottai, Manamadurai, Paramakkudi, Ramanathapuram, Mandapam and Pamban.

History

The train's name commemorates the 19th century mail service between Tamil Nadu and Sri Lanka (then Ceylon). It is one of the top most prestigious trains of Indian Railways and it has completed 100 years of service in 2014.
Devakottai,  and Rameswaram. Due to the conversion of meter gauge to broad gauge, the train was stopped. After the completion of broad-gauge track in Chennai–Madurai–Rameswaram line, the train is resumed via . Later the conversion of Tiruchirappalli–Manamadurai line, this train is rerouted via that route which skips Madurai. Finally the Mayiladuthurai to Thanjavur line is converted to broad gauge once again this train is rerouted via Thanjavur which is the present route of Boat Mail Express.

Tuticorin–Colombo era
In the late 19th century, the railway portion of the route within India was from Madras (Chennai) to Tuticorin. At Tuticorin, passengers embarked on the boat mail steamer to Colombo in Ceylon. The train took 21 hours and 50 minutes for the journey from Madras to Tuticorin. The Boat Mail was one of the early trains to be given vestibuled carriages, in 1898.

Dhanushkodi–Talaimannar era
In 1914, after the Pamban bridge was built, the train's route changed and it went from Madras to Dhanushkodi. A much shorter ferry service then took the passengers to Talaimannar in Ceylon, from where another train went to Colombo.

Post cyclone
In 1964 a passenger train was washed into the sea by huge waves during the 1964 cyclone, when nearing Dhanushkodi. The railway tracks and the pier at Dhanushkodi were also destroyed. Following this, the Indian portion of the train service now only operates up to Rameswaram, while the ferry service to Talaimannar has restarted from Rameswaram has been discontinued from 1984 due to Tamil Eelam issue.

Schedule

 16851 – Starts from Chennai Egmore daily at 19:15 IST and reaches Rameswaram next day at 08:20 AM IST
 16852 – Leaves Rameswaram every day at 17:20 IST and reaches Chennai Egmore next day morning 06:45 IST

Traction 

The Rameswaram to Tiruchchirappalli section is hauled by a WDM-3A/WDG-3A Diesel locomotive and Tiruchchirappalli to Chennai Egmore by a WAP-4 electric loco. The same locomotive types are used on the return journey.

Coach composition 
It includes One AC First Class cum 2nd AC (HA), AC 2 Tier (A), AC 3 Tier (B), Sleeper Class (SL), Unreserved general sitting coach (GS) and End on Generators (SLRD).

Alternative proposals
However, this plan was shelved when World War I broke out.

Rake

Locomotive

 Rameswaram (Boat Mail) Express Running Chennai to Trichy with WAP-4 Locomotive from Erode, Arakkonam Electric Shed.

 Trichy - Rameswaram WDM-3A, WDP-3A, WDG-3A Locomotive from Diesel Loco Shed, Golden Rock

See also 

List of named passenger trains of Sri Lanka
Rail transport in India
Ananthapuri Express
Chennai Egmore-Nagercoil Weekly Superfast Express
Nellai Superfast Express
Pallavan Superfast Express
Vaigai Superfast Express
Rockfort (Malaikottai) Superfast Express
Tiruchendur (Chendur) Express
Pearl City (Muthunagar) Superfast Express
Pandian Superfast Express
Kanniyakumari Superfast Express
Pothigai Superfast Express
Uzhavan Express

References 

History of transport in Sri Lanka
Ferry transport in Sri Lanka
Defunct trains in India
Ferry transport in India
Named passenger trains of Sri Lanka
Named passenger trains of India
Transport in Chennai
Transport in Rameswaram
Rail transport in Tamil Nadu
Railway services introduced in 1914
Express trains in India